Fiat-Sollers was a joint venture between Fiat S.p.A. and Sollers JSC (formerly Severstal Avto). Each company had a 50% share in the venture, and the product range was determined by Fiat.

Overview 

It had its origins in January 2006, when a licensing agreement was first signed between the two companies. As part of the deal, Severstal Avto became the distributor of the full range of Fiat cars and commercial vehicles. Fiat-branded cars from the venture were launched at the Moscow International Automobile Salon of 2006.

Complete knock-down kits of the Fiat Albea sedan and Fiat Doblò van were assembled for the Russian market in Naberezhnye Chelny, in  the facilities of the ZMA automotive company. An agreement to manufacture the F1A diesel engine for the Fiat Ducato and the UAZ Patriot in Nizhniy Novgorod was signed in December 2006.

A new factory in Yelabuga was established as part of the joint venture to manufacture the Fiat Linea. The facility was also used to produce the Fiat Ducato. In May 2008 Vladimir Putin drove the first Fiat Ducato to come out of the new factory.

A formal joint venture structure between the companies was set up in February 2010. In February 2011, Sollers decided to terminate their partnership with Fiat at the end of the year, and the Naverezhny Chelny plant was offered to Ford as part of the new Ford Sollers joint venture.

Production
 Fiat Albea
 Fiat Palio
 Fiat Doblo
 Fiat Linea
 Fiat Ducato

References

External links
 Fiat page on the Severstal Avto website (archive)

Fiat
Sollers JSC
Vehicle manufacturing companies established in 2006
Vehicle manufacturing companies disestablished in 2011
Multinational joint-venture companies
Defunct motor vehicle manufacturers of Russia